Puiseux may refer to

Geography
 Puiseux, Ardennes, a French commune in the Ardennes department
 Puiseux, Eure-et-Loir, a French commune in the Eure-et-Loir department

Science
 Puiseux crater, a crater on the moon
 Puiseux series, a mathematical series
 Victor Puiseux, a 19th-century French mathematician

See also
 Puiseaux